Teal Wicks (born September 8, 1982 in Sacramento, California) is an American singer and stage actress, who is best known for her performances as Elphaba in the Broadway, San Francisco, and Los Angeles productions of the musical Wicked and as Mary Barrie in the musical Finding Neverland.

In 2013, Wicks played the role of Emma Carew, Dr. Jekyll's fiancée, in the 2013 Broadway revival of Jekyll & Hyde. Wicks starred as Lady in The Cher Show at the Neil Simon Theatre on Broadway for the entirety of its run, from October 2018 to August 2019.

Education
Wicks attended Natomas High School in Sacramento, California. She graduated from UC Irvine in 2005 with a degree in Drama and Honors in Musical Theatre. She was active in the UCI Theatre program and had lead roles in productions including Chicago, Hair, and Cabaret. She is also a member of Kappa Alpha Theta at UCI.

On May 12, 2011, Wicks was feted by the UCI Alumni Association along with other distinguished individuals during the 41st annual Lauds & Laurels ceremony held at the Hyatt Regency Irvine. She was conferred the honor of Distinguished Alumna of the Claire Trevor School of the Arts.

Wicks serves on the Advisory Board of the California State Summer School for the Arts.

Wicked

Wicked in Los Angeles
Wicks was cast as the standby for Elphaba in the Los Angeles production of the musical Wicked during the fall of 2007, after six auditions for multiple roles with several Wicked productions. She officially took over the standby role on January 1, 2008, with her first performance taking place on January 9. On May 13, 2008, she was offered to take over the lead role of Elphaba from Caissie Levy in the Los Angeles production.

During her five months as Elphaba, she performed alongside Megan Hilty, Erin Mackey, and Emily Rozek as Glinda. Her final performance was on October 29, 2008; however, on that day, she left mid-performance after the train station scene because she was sick. As a result, Angel Reda, her understudy, took over for the remainder of the show. Original Los Angeles cast member Eden Espinosa replaced Wicks in the role on Halloween. Wicked Los Angeles closed on January 11, 2009, and was one of the most financially successful musicals in Los Angeles theatre history.

Wicked in San Francisco
Wicked co-creator Stephen Schwartz said in a 2009 interview that his team had assembled an "all-star line-up, in terms of people who have really done a good job and scored very well in their roles in these other cities" for the newly planned San Francisco production of Wicked. Wicks was chosen to originate the role of Elphaba, and co-lead Kendra Kassebaum was chosen to originate the role of Glinda. The San Francisco production opened on February 6, 2009.

Reception

The San Francisco production of Wicked received critical acclaim from audiences.

The San Francisco Chronicle:

"This Sacramento native (Wicks) is dynamite in the talent department, with a soaring singing voice and a way of balancing her character's vulnerability and wickedness. It's the performance that really defines this particular production."

The Contra Costa Times:

"The cast, particularly Wicks and Kassebaum, is outstanding. The two leads are flat-out incredible, with voices that must be heard to be believed and acting chops that squeeze every bit of nuance out of the material created".

The San Francisco Examiner:

"Teal Wicks plays the role with incredible heart, showing with both subtlety and all-out emotion how the slighted girl born with green skin is simply misunderstood."

Further information

Wicks performed during the production with both Academy Award-winner Patty Duke and Emmy Award-winner Carol Kane, both as Madame Morrible. Wicks also performed alongside Natalie Daradich and Libby Servais (standbys) and Alexa Green (understudy) as Glinda. Wicks was on leave from the production from the end of March until early May 2009, during which the role was covered by Vicki Noon.

The Wicked San Francisco production was seen by nearly one million people during its first year, according to The Best of Broadway, and averaged over $1.0 million in weekly grosses at the box office, according to Variety Magazine. Wicked was named "Musical of the Decade" during 2009 by Entertainment Weekly.

Wicks played her final performance as Elphaba on February 28, 2010, after performing the role over 500 times during a two-year period between the Los Angeles and San Francisco productions. Eden Espinosa replaced her a second time, the first being in L.A.

Wicks' performance in San Francisco won her many fans and inspired the San Francisco-based Wicked fan group known as "the TWickies" (the name coming from "T.Wicks"). The TWickies were die-hard fans of Wicked in San Francisco even after Wicks' departure and remain loyal followers of her career today.<ref>{{cite web|last=Wilson|first=Gemma|date=February 7, 2011|title=Teal Wicks, Wicked'''s Newest Elphaba, Talks Rent, Idina and Her Tenacious 'Twickies'|url=http://www.broadway.com/shows/wicked/buzz/155168/teal-wicks-wickeds-newest-elphaba-talks-rent-idina-and-her-tenacious-twickies/|url-status=live|website=Broadway.com}}</ref>

Wicks was chosen as the "Favorite Elphaba", among all the actresses who have played the role, in an online February 2010 poll with over 65,000 voters.

An online poll was conducted in December 2010 to vote for Who is the "Wicked" Personality of the Year. Wicks has been awarded after winning the poll with over 20,000 votes (42%), leading by almost 8,000 votes.

Wicked on Broadway
On February 2, 2011, Wicks made her Broadway debut replacing Mandy Gonzalez as Elphaba in Wicked at the Gershwin Theatre. She starred alongside Katie Rose Clarke as Glinda for her seven-month run, which came to an end on September 25. She and Clarke were replaced by Jackie Burns and Chandra Lee Schwartz, respectively, as Elphaba and Glinda.

Broadway credits

Wicked Broadway
Wicks appeared in the Broadway production of Wicked in the lead role of Elphaba. She made her Broadway debut on February 1, 2011 replacing Mandy Gonzalez in the role. Wicks departed the role on September 25, 2011, along with co-star Katie Rose Clarke. They were succeeded by Jackie Burns and Chandra Lee Schwartz. Wicks performed the role on Broadway for nearly eight months, whereas Clarke will have appeared as Glinda for nearly two years.

Wicks was named Broadway's Hottest Girl 2011 alongside Aaron Tveit as Broadway's Hottest Guy 2011 in an online poll, over 10,000 votes were cast.

Jekyll & Hyde: The Musical

Wicks starred as Emma Carew, Dr. Jekyll's fiancée, in the Broadway revival of Jekyll & Hyde alongside Tony-nominee and former American Idol contestant Constantine Maroulis in the title role, and R&B superstar Deborah Cox as Lucy Harris. The new production began previews on Broadway at the Marquis Theatre on April 5, 2013, and officially opened on April 18, 2013. It closed on May 12, 2013. ahead of its scheduled 13-week run. Prior to the Broadway opening, the show went on a 25-week national tour that began previews in La Mirada, California, on September 7, 2012.

Reviews:

BroadwayWorld Houston:

"Playing Emma Carew, Teal Wicks brings her fantastically trained and elegant Broadway presence to the show and uses her technique to both characterize and differentiate her performance from the other two leads. Her delicate and poised singing voice is the perfect counter to Constantine Maroulis’ raw edge. Teal Wicks is delightful and is supremely memorable in her expert renditions of "Take Me As I Am" and "In His Eyes.""

Houston Chronicle:

"Teal Wicks is so enchanting and exuberant as Emma Carew, Jekyll’s fiancée, that I found myself looking forward to her next appearance as soon as she left the stage. Her duet with Deborah Cox, "In His Eyes," one of the best songs in the show, is masterfully and gorgeously realized by both ladies."

BroadwayWorld Durham:

"The dark horse of this trio is the seemingly unassuming Wicks, who ends up blowing away the audience with her finely honed and quite impressive voice. She sings just as well in her upper register as in her chest voice, and, in the classiest way possibly, steals the show."

BroadwayWorld Denver:

"Teal Wicks dominated the stage as Dr. Jekyll's fiancée, Emma Carew and totally stole the show and my heart. She was in a league of her own with her outstanding and captivating performance that had everyones attention. She showed so much depth in Once Upon a Dream and the Take Me as I Am duet was a crowd favorite."

Hollywood Reporter:

"Teal Wicks, last seen on Broadway as the green-hued witch Elphaba in Wicked, sings beautifully and brings some generally poignant moments to her performance as Jekyll’s devoted fiancée Emma."

Associated Press:

"Wicks is luminous in the underwritten part of Jekyll's fiancée but still manages to lend some glamor and skill to the part. Both women deliver a knockout duet "In His Eyes.""The New York Times:

"The actors portraying the sniveling or snobbish enemies of Dr. Jekyll all perform their chores with flavorsome relish, and Teal Wicks, as his ladylike love interest Emma Carew, suffers with noble fortitude as her hopes for happy matrimony begin to grow dim indeed."

CurtainUp:

"I have to admire the restrained performance of Teal Wicks who plays Emma, Dr. Jekyll's loving and loyal fiancée. I also commend her for not having to prove that her prettily sung aria was better than anyone else's."

The Write Teacher(s):

"What blew me away about this production was Teal Wicks. Her presence, her vocals, her acting chops – from soup to nuts she was a pleasure to watch, and she absolutely drew me into the story, as well as those who were watching the show with me. The duet between her at Deborah Cox,"In His Eyes", was my favorite number of the show."

New York Theater:

"Teal Wick’s performance as Emma Carew, Jekyll’s fiancée, also stands out."

Finding Neverland
Teal Wicks played Mary Barrie in the musical Finding Neverland from its premiere in March 2015 until its closing in August 2016. The musical is based on the Miramax motion picture by David Magee and the play The Man Who Was Peter Pan by Allan Knee, which followed the relationship between playwright J. M. Barrie, played by Matthew Morrison, and the family that inspired Peter Pan. The production was directed by Tony Award-winner Diane Paulus with book by Olivier Award nominee James Graham, music and lyrics by U.K. pop sensation Gary Barlow and Grammy Award-winner Eliot Kennedy, and choreography by Emmy Award-winner Mia Michaels. It starred Emmy Award-winner Kelsey Grammer as Charles Frohman, Olivier Award-winner Laura Michelle Kelly as Sylvia Llewlyn Davies, and Tony Award-nominee Carolee Carmello as Madame Du Maurier.

The Cher Show
In April 2018, it was announced that Wicks would join Stephanie J. Block and Micaela Diamond as the three actors to play singer Cher in The Cher Show. The show had a pre-Broadway engagement in Chicago at the Oriental Theatre, beginning on June 12, 2018, and running through July 15. The production then opened on Broadway at the Neil Simon Theatre on December 3, 2018, and played its final performance on August 18, 2019.

Off-Broadway credits

The Blue Flower - Second Stage Theatre Production

Wicks reprised her role as Maria in an Off-Broadway production of The Blue Flower at Second Stage Theatre in the fall of 2011. Previews began on October 14, 2011, and the production opened on November 9, 2011. Costarring in the show were Meghan McGeary, who also reprised her role, Marc Kudisch, Sebastian Arcelus, Joseph Medeiros, Julia Osborne, Graham Rowat, and Aaron Serotsky. The show ran until November 27, 2011.

Reviews:

Back Stage:

"Wicks soars on the moving Act 1 closer, "Eiffel Tower," in which Maria deals with Franz's death"
"I particularly loved an icy, regimented Charleston danced by a grieving black-clad Maria"

Variety:

"Teal Wicks, a replacement Elphaba in "Wicked," is a wonderful find as Maria; she closes the first act with an exquisite solo, "Eiffel Tower," and combines well with Arcelus for "Love.""

The Official Blog of the Arts Initiative at Columbia University:

"I have to say, though, as far as singing goes, Teal Wicks absolutely stole the show with this virtuosic performance. Overall, head voice, chest voice & mix are each beautifully developed in Ms. Wicks, but the truly impressive part is how effortlessly she weaves back and forth between them. Sometimes I heard elements of all three registrations at different points within the same word. She has truly mastered the many facets of her voice, and it is that facility that allows her to be as expressive as she is. With an instrument as refined and capable as hers, she can fully embody musical phrases with all the subtext and emotion of the composer & lyricist’s intentions. She has a myriad of vocal tools at her disposal and is a true virtuoso with each one. It is not every day that I see singers with such versatility and mastery of the subtleties of the human voice. I’m certain we can expect many more great things from Ms. Wicks in the future."

New York Times:

"Teal Wicks, as Maria, sings with an expressiveness and richness of tone that enchants"

Time Out New York:

"Wicks is poised to emerge as a major star"

History News Network:

"The strength of The Blue Flower is the talented ensemble cast of Sebastian Arcelus (Franz), Marc Kudisch (Max), Meghan McGeary (Hannah) and Teal Wicks (Maria). They are good actors and good singers (especially Wicks). Wicks sings a soulful ballad at the end of act one, from on top of the Eiffel Tower, that's dazzling....
The songs have a familiar ring to each other, but Wicks’ act one sendoff is a gem, as are a few powerful ballads in act one."

Piece of My Heart: The Bert Berns Story

Teal Wicks was cast to play the young Ilene Berns, in the musical Piece of My Heart: The Bert Berns Story, a new musical based on the life and songs of legendary songwriter Bert Berns that opened Off-Broadway July 21, 2014.Piece of My Heart, according to press notes, "tells his remarkable story, once dubbed by Rolling Stone 'one of the great untold stories of rock and roll,' through his hit songs, which include 'Twist and Shout,' 'Tell Him,' 'I Want Candy,' 'Hang On Sloopy,' 'Cry Baby' and many more."

Featuring a book by Daniel Goldfarb and direction and choreography by Denis Jones, Piece of My Heart began previews June 25, 2014 at The Irene Diamond Stage at The Pershing Square Signature Center.

Regional credits

Pippin
Wicks performed in the lead role of Catherine for the 2006-2007 National Tour of Stephen Schwartz's musical Pippin, a role that she also reprised at the Goodspeed Opera House.

The Blue Flower - American Repertory Theater Production

From December 2010 through January 8, 2011, Wicks played the role of Maria in American Repertory Theater's The Blue Flower. According to A.R.T., "The Blue Flower rides the twisted rails of history and the tangled love interests of three artists and a scientist, from Paris during the Belle Epoque, through the battlefields of the Great War and beyond."

It is inspired by the lives of historical figures Max Beckmann, Franz Marc, Hannah Höch, and Marie Curie.

This is the first and so far only musical that Stephen Schwartz is producing. According to Schwartz "The Blue Flower is the most creative and original piece of musical theater that I have ever encountered in my life. The story is beautiful, relevant, and compelling for our times. The music is amazingly accessible." And when asked about his producing venture he replied "Yes. It’s my first and probably my only one. In other words, I am doing this not because I want to be a producer, but because this particular show is something that I believe in and want to bring to other people."

Wicks received rave reviews, including

TheaterMania:

"Meanwhile, it's Marie's loss of Franz that occupies the emotional core of the story. Wicks, though herself young and fresh, manages to plumb several lifetimes' worth of sorrow in her two laments: "Eiffel Tower" (about the Parisian idyll that Marie and Franz will never get to enjoy) and "(Let It) Slide through Your Hands" (a moving ballad that touches on the acceptance that death forces upon us). As she sings, you may have the sensation that, for one profound moment suspended in time, all around you are steeped in their own memories of loved ones now lost."

The Patriot Ledger:

"And I’m recommending that they just round up this cast and take them into a studio to create a cast recording. The voices are beautiful, led by the remarkable gifts of Wicks, who produces a sweet and soulful sound. Her "(Let It) Slide Through Your Hands" is a tender and touching highlight of the show."

Dig Boston:

"Lucas Kavner and Teal Wicks as the war-torn lovers Franz and Maria make the tragic story palpable and supremely moving."

Boston Globe:

"The songs that work best are the ones that speak most directly. Wicks and Kavner team up for "Love,’’ a touching duet, and Wicks delivers a wrenchingly heartfelt version of "Eiffel Tower,’’ in which she mourns the dead Franz: "Each day is like no other/ No century like another/ In a river every moment passing new/ This day was like no other/ I climbed the Eiffel Tower/ And saw the rooftops from the angel’s view.’’"

Boston Herald:

"... we ache for her when Wicks lets loose on the gorgeous ballad "Eiffel Tower.""

Wicks was recognized for her work as Maria by the BroadwayWorld community. She was voted as 2011 BroadwayWorld Boston Award for Best Actress in a Musical. The Blue Flower won Best Musical, Will Pomerantz for Best Direction of a Musical and Daniel Jenkins for Best Actor in a Musical.

She was nominated for an IRNE Award for Best Actress by the 2011 Independent Reviewers of New England (IRNE) in February 2011. She was also nominated for Outstanding Musical Performance at the 2011 Elliot Norton Awards, which recognize excellence in Greater Boston Theater. Although she did not win the individual award, The Blue Flower took home the Best Musical award plus five others during IRNE award ceremonies held on April 25, 2011 at the Boston for the Arts Cyclorama. The show also took home Outstanding Local Musical Production and Outstanding Design (Large Theater) at the Elliot Norton Awards held last May 23, 2011.

Carousel
Teal Wicks starred as Julie Jordan in Goodspeed Musicals production of Rodgers and Hammerstein Carousel. Carousel began its previews on July 13, 2012 at the Goodspeed Opera House in Connecticut; it opened on August 1, 2012. The show was well received by critics and Broadway.com gave it a big thumbs up. Wicks left the show on August 5th to start rehearsal for the Broadway-bound national tour revival of Jekyll & Hyde as Emma Carew. She was replaced by Erin Davie.

Wicks won Best Actress in a Musical at the 2012 BroadwayWorld Connecticut Awards for her portrayal as Julie Jordan.

Reviews:

TheaterMania:

"As Julie, Teal Wicks conveys so much character succinctly and clearly, but does so with a wonderfully real sense of no-nonsense, New England restraint. As the plot unfolds, and Julie's relationship with Billy undergoes an increasingly dire set of challenges, Wicks allows the emotion of her character to radiate from within. "

Connecticut Critics Circle:

"As Julie, Teal Wicks is a stunner. Her performance is heartbreaking in all of the right ways... terrifically balanced sense of fragility and steel."

Broadway.com:

"Snyder is a standout in a cast filled with top-notch players, including wonderful Wicked girl Teal Wicks as Julie Jordan"

The Wall Street Journal:

"..Julie Jordan initially played by the excellent Teal Wicks"

In the Spotlight:

"Teal Wicks brings a unique, straight forward, Yankee, sensibility to Julie but her lovely voice is underserved by the score."

Examiner.com by Andrew Beck:

"Wicks, invests her Julie with just the right combination of innocence and strength, delineating her character's tentative flirtation with the danger that Billy represents along with her growing determination to at last seek something that she deeply desires. She possesses a lovely, sound singing voice that can fill with passion for "If I Loved You" or assert itself ironically in "What's the Use of Wondrin'." She's also able to subsequently depict Julie's world-weariness as the musical jumps ahead 15 years in its later scenes, as well as an enduring connection to her true love."

Hartford Courant:

"Wicks’ Julie is a fine match and creates a self-possessed, but also insecure, character who you believe can fall in love in an instant, stay with such a damaged husband, and persevere with an inner strength and peace."

Times Square Chronicles:

"Julie, at the performance I saw, was sung and acted beautifully by Teal Wicks. Wicks and Snyder are tenderly believable in their "If I Loved You" duet."

Post-Chronicle:

"Miss Wicks is especially good at making sure Julie never comes off as a victim in what is, essentially, domestic abuse from Billy. Wicks successfully demonstrates the steel spine beneath the warm humanity and delicacy of her character."

The Ballad Of Little Jo
Teal Wicks starred as Josephine/Jo Monaghan in "The Ballad Of Little Jo" held in Two River Theater (Red Bank, NJ) on June 3–25, 2017. A cast album was released on November 12, 2017.

Additional theatre

In 2006, Wicks performed in the New York Premier of Fahrenheit 451 as Clarisse. In 2007, she appeared in the New York City Center Encores! production of Stairway to Paradise. Wicks originated the role of Turandot in the World Premier of Turandot: The Rumble for the Ring at the Bay Street Theatre. She also appeared in 1776 as Martha Jefferson at the Goodspeed Opera House.Goodspeed Musicals: 1776 (September 28 through December 9, 2007) She was also involved in the reading of The $trip, a dance musical which features music and lyrics by Lance Horne.

In between her engagements with Wicked LA and SF, Wicks participated in a workshop for Prometheus Bound in New York, playing the role of "IO". Prometheus Bound is a rock-infused musical from Spring Awakening's Tony-winning lyricist and book writer Steven Sater.

Wicks starred in Most Likely to Die: A Slasher Musical'', as part of New York Musical Festival's 2010 Developmental Series.

Theatre credits

Charity appearances & performances

Television

Discography

Commercial

References

External links 

Official Website

American musical theatre actresses
Actresses from Sacramento, California
Living people
1982 births
Musicians from Sacramento, California
Singers from California
21st-century American women